The 1950 Arkansas Razorbacks football team represented the University of Arkansas in the Southwest Conference (SWC) during the 1950 college football season. In their first year under head coach Otis Douglas, the Razorbacks compiled a 2–8 record (1–5 against SWC opponents), finished in last place in the SWC, and were outscored by their opponents by a combined total of 163 to 156. George Eckert was the team captain.

Schedule

References

Arkansas
Arkansas Razorbacks football seasons
Arkansas Razorbacks football